This article describes the knockout stage of the 2020–21 LEN Euro Cup.

The 2020–21 LEN Euro Cup knockout phase will begin on 27 February with the playoffs and end on 8 May 2021 with the final.

Qualified teams
The knockout phase involves the sixteen teams which qualified as winners and runners-up of each of the eight groups in the qualification round.

Format
In the eight-finals, the first-placed team from one group faces the second-placed team from the other group. The eight winning teams advance to the quarterfinals. The four quarterfinal winners qualify for the semifinals and the winners of the semifinals qualify for the finals.

Times were CET/CEST, as listed by LEN (local times, if different, are in parentheses).

Schedule
The schedule is as follows.

Bracket

Eight Finals
The draw for the eight-finals was held on 16 December 2020. The first legs were played on 27 February, and the second legs were played on 3 March 2021.

Overview

|}

Matches

Radnički Kragujevac won 11–10 on aggregate.

OSC Budapest won 42–15 on aggregate.

Crvena zvezda won 19–15 on aggregate.

Szolnok won 35–24 on aggregate.

AstralPool Sabadell won 26–15 on aggregate.

Vouliagmeni won 16–15 on aggregate.

Dynamo Moscow won 23–18 on aggregate.

Mladost Zagreb won 18–15 on aggregate.

Quarter-finals
The draw for the quarter-finals was held on 9 March 2021. The first legs were played on 17 March, and the second legs were played on 24 March 2021.

Overview

|}

Matches

Crvena zvezda won 20–17 on aggregate.

Crvena zvezda won 24–22 on aggregate.

21–21 on aggregate. Vouliagmeni won 9–8 on penalties.

OSC Budapest won 27–23 on aggregate.

Semi-finals
The draw for the semi-finals was held on 23 March 2021. The first legs were played on 3 April, and the second legs were played on 10 April 2021.

Overview

|}

Matches

OSC Budapest won 21–16 on aggregate.

Szolnok won 35–20 on aggregate.

Finals
The first legs were played on 24 April, and the second legs were played on 8 May 2021.

Overview

|}

Matches

Notes

References

External links
, len.microplustiming.com

Knockout Phase